The 1998 Croatia Open Umag was a tennis tournament played on outdoor clay courts in Umag, Croatia that was part of the International Series of the 1998 ATP Tour. The tournament was held from July 27 through August 2, 1998.

Seeds
Champion seeds are indicated in bold text while text in italics indicates the round in which those seeds were eliminated.

Draw

Finals

References

Doubles
Croatia Open
1998 in Croatian tennis